"(It's No) Sin" is a 1951 popular song with music by George Hoven and lyrics by Chester R. Shull.  This song should not be confused with "It's a Sin", another popular song of the same era.

First recordings
Popular recordings of the song were made by The Four Aces and Eddy Howard.

The recording by Eddy Howard was released by Mercury Records (catalog number 5711). It first reached the Billboard chart on September 14, 1951, and lasted 23 weeks on the chart, peaking at number 1.

The recording by The Four Aces was released by Victoria Records (catalog number 101). It first reached the Billboard chart on September 7, 1951, and lasted 22 weeks on the chart, peaking at number 4. This was The Four Aces' first charting record, and led to their receiving a contract with a major company, Decca.

Other recordings
Coleman Hawkins recorded it in October 1951 and Sidney Bechet recorded it with his All-Stars in January 1952 (entitled It's No Sin (Est-Ce Un Peche?)).
Knud Pfeiffer wrote the Danish lyrics. The Danish title is "Er det synd". Raquel Rastenni with Radiodansekorkesteret recorded it in Copenhagen in 1952. The song was released on the 78 rpm record His Master's Voice X 8043.
The song was revived in 1964 by The Duprees, a group that made a number of recordings of 1950s hits. This version peaked at #74 on the US Hot 100.
Ronnie Dove released a country version of the song for Decca Records in 1972.

References

1951 singles
Number-one singles in the United States
1951 songs
Eddy Howard songs
The Four Aces songs